Aidil Johari (born 5 April 2003) is a Singaporean footballer currently playing as a defender for Balestier Khalsa.

Club

Balestier Khalsa
He made his debut against Young Lions.

Career statistics

Club

Notes

International statistics

References

2003 births
Living people
Singaporean footballers
Association football defenders
Singapore Premier League players
Balestier Khalsa FC players